Doctor Who: The Lost Stories is a sci-fi audio series produced by Big Finish Productions of Doctor Who audio plays adapted from unused TV stories.

Episodes

Series 1 (2009–10)
The first series is largely adapted from stories planned for the unmade 1985–1986 series. Colin Baker and Nicola Bryant star as the Sixth Doctor and Peri.

Clegg wrote a detailed story breakdown for Point of Entry, which Platt turned into a complete script. Hammond wrote an incomplete script for Paradise 5, which was completed and adapted for audio by Lane. Martin, Bidmead, and Mills have revised their own scripts, with Bidmead describing his revision as a "top-to-bottom rewrite". Paul Finch approached Big Finish with a complete script that his father Brian had written for Season 22 in 1985. The story was completely unknown to Big Finish before this. Michael Feeney Callan's The Children of January was originally part of the line-up, but fell through due to the author's other commitments and was replaced by The Macros.

Series 2 (2010–11)
The first release of the second series is The First Doctor Boxset, a four-disc boxed set including Moris Farhi's stories Farewell Great Macedon and The Fragile Yellow Arc of Fragrance. Farhi's scripts for Farewell Great Macedon have been adapted as an enhanced audiobook, performed by William Russell and Carole Ann Ford, who, respectively, played Ian Chesterton and Susan Foreman.

The second release is The Second Doctor Boxset, another four-disc boxed set including Dick Sharples' The Prison in Space. Sharples' story has been adapted by Simon Guerrier, and is performed by Frazer Hines and Wendy Padbury, who played Jamie McCrimmon and Zoe Heriot. The set also includes The Destroyers, the unmade pilot episode of a proposed Dalek-centred spin-off series for American TV. The episode has been adapted as a full-cast drama, with Nicholas Briggs as the voice of the Daleks.

The remaining releases have been adapted from stories planned for the unmade Season 27, and introduced a new companion for the Seventh Doctor, a young safecracker named Raine Creevy, played by Beth Chalmers. They were released monthly from January–April 2011 are as follows.

The character of Raine makes her debut as an adult in Crime of the Century, but appears as a newborn baby in Thin Ice; Beth Chalmers plays Raine's mother in that story.

Fourth Doctor Lost Stories (2012)

Series 3 (2011–12)
This third batch of stories features three stories with the Fifth Doctor, Nyssa and Tegan Jovanka, followed by three stories with the Sixth Doctor and Peri, followed by dramatic readings of a First Doctor and Second Doctor story to round out the final two releases of the series. This series was released in October 2011 – September 2012.

Series 4 (2013)
A fourth series of stories was released in 2013, featuring one story with the First Doctor, two with the Second Doctor and one with the Third Doctor, featuring the first Third Doctor lost story ever released. The series was released September–December 2013, and the first three stories are connected because they were all originally by Brian Hayles.

Series 5 (2019)
Two further stories were released in November 2019. The first features the Fifth Doctor, Tegan, and Turlough in an unmade story from Season 21 while the second features the Sixth Doctor and Peri in a fourth story from the unmade 1985–1986 series.

Series 6 (2021)

Special (2022) 
On 18 January 2021, Russell T Davies, former Doctor Who showrunner revealed that, in preparation for a watch party for "The Runaway Bride", he found an old spec script that he submitted to the BBC in 1985–86, titled "Mind of the Hodiac". The audio adaptation of the script was co-written by Scott Handcock, and released in March 2022. It features the Sixth Doctor, alongside companion Mel.

Series 7

References 

Audio plays based on Doctor Who
Big Finish Productions